{{Infobox settlement

| official_name          = Monastir
| native_name            = المنستير
| native_name_lang       = ar
| other_name             = 
| settlement_type        = 

| image_skyline          = View of Monastir from the ribat tower.jpg
| imagesize              = 250px
| image_caption          = Monastir from the ribats tower
| image_flag             = 
| image_seal             = Armoiries Monastir.svg
| seal_size              = 150px
| image_shield           = 
| image_map              = Monastir from space.jpg
| map_caption            = Monastir from space
| pushpin_map            = Tunisia
| pushpin_label_position = bottom
| pushpin_map_caption    = Location in Tunisia

| coordinates            = 
| subdivision_type       = Country
| subdivision_name       = 
| subdivision_type1      = Governorate
| subdivision_name1      = Monastir Governorate
| subdivision_type2      = Delegation(s) 
| subdivision_name2      = Monastir
| established_title      = 
| established_date       = 
| leader_title           = Mayor
| leader_name            = Mondher Marzouk  (Independent) 

| unit_pref              = Imperial 
| area_total_km2         = 
| area_land_km2          = 
| area_water_km2         = 
| elevation_footnotes    = 
| elevation_m            =

| population_footnotes   = 
| population_total       = 93306
| population_as_of       = 2014
| population_density_km2 = auto

| timezone               = CET
| utc_offset             = 1
| timezone_DST           = 
| utc_offset_DST         =

| postal_code_type       = ZIP code  
| postal_code            = 5000
| area_code              = 73
| website                = 
Traditionally a fishing port, Monastir is now a major tourist resort. Its population is about 93,306. It is the capital of Monastir Governorate.

 Geography 
 Location 

Monastir is a peninsula surrounded by the Mediterranean Sea on three sides and forming, to the south, the Gulf of Monasti of the same name, which extends to Cap of Ras Dimass. It offers diverse landscapes, in particular its sandy and rocky beaches as well as a cliff stretching over nearly six kilometers.

History

Monastir was founded on the ruins of the Punic–Roman city of Ruspina. The city features a well-preserved Ribat of Monastir that was used to scan the sea for hostile ships and as a defence against the attacks of the Byzantine fleet. Several ulema came to stay in the ribat of this peaceful city for contemplation. The ribat was, in the 1970s, also one of the filming locations for both the miniseries Jesus of Nazareth and Monty Python's Life of Brian. There are panoramic views of the city taken from a French naval intelligence airship in 1924.

Transportation
The city is on the electrified, metre-gauge Sahel Metro line with trains serving Sousse and Mahdia which the city is served by 5 stations of the metro : Hôtels Monastir,Aéroport Skanès-Monastir,Faculté Monastir,Monastir,Monastir-Zone indistruelle. Monastir – Habib Bourguiba International Airport has flights from most Western European countries. It is run by Tepe Akfen Ventures Airport Holding (TAV).

Climate
Monastir has a hot semi-arid climate (Köppen BSh) with hot summers, pleasant winters, much sunshine and low rainfall year-round. The city sits in the northeast of Tunisia, on its central coast. It is milder than inland areas of Tunisia, forty percent of which is part of the Sahara. In the summer, while humidity is low, the soaring heat can still be hard to handle.

Economy
The industrial sector, tourism and agriculture constituting the main activities of the population : 
The economy of this region is also based on agriculture. The 86% of land used for agriculture, of which 13,125 ha are public or private irrigated areas. 450 ha are forests against 4,600 ha for rangelands. The livestock production is around 74,500 head (cattle, goats, sheep). Regarding the main agricultural products, the region produces in particular fishery products (23,983 t / year), red meat, poultry, milk, oil and olive. Olive cultivation covers an area of 60,000 ha. Monastir is also making a reputation for the production of vegetable crops (169,702 t / year) and arboriculture (11,297 t). The development of agriculture is favored by the presence of 8 hill lakes and hill dams. The establishment of a dozen aquaculture sites in the lagoon of Monastir also allows the region to engage in the breeding of sea bream and sea bass.

The tourist sector occupies the third occupation of the population with luxury hotels by the sea, golf courses ... the region attracts many foreign tourists. The tourism sector has more than fifty hotel units with a total accommodation capacity of more than 25,440 beds. These hotels provide 9,000 jobs. In addition to the 8th century ribat, the great mosque, the Bourguiba mosque, the museums, the souk, the Kiriates islands, the city also has other assets such as the marina, diving centers, two golf courses. , a racecourse, night clubs etc. Entertainment abounds between fun and sporting activities. For its last 5 decades, it has attracted tourists by the seaside potential of Saknes. It has two hotel units, a museum, a marine district and the marina. There is also the tourist area of Jinène El Oust which has 6 residential units and the Bekalta area which has 6 hotel units and entertainment lots. In addition, the region's transport infrastructure is also one of the determining factors in the growth of this governorate. Indeed, it has an international airport, a train station, and a metro that connects it to Sousse and Mahdia. Buses, taxis, rental vehicles also connect it to these two other governorates.

Nouvelair has its head office in Monastir in the Dkhila Tourist Zone,"Après le vol." Nouvelair. Retrieved on 1 July 2010. near the Hôtel Sahara Beach.

 Culture 
 Cultural Heritage 

Monastir has a museum of Islamic arts, inaugurated on August 5, 1958, and which is housed on the first floor of the south wing of the ribat; it contains nearly 300 works (fragments of wood, funerary stelae, polished ceramics, etc.) and receives the visit of almost 100,000 visitors every year.

 Music 
The ethnomusicologist and clarinetist Hassine Haj Youssef is one of Monastir's most active personalities in the musical field. A disciple of Salah El Mahdi, he is also the father of the violinist and composer Jasser Haj Youssef. He is a professor at the National Conservatory of Monastir and at the Higher Institute of Music of Sousse. He has adapted the method of Zoltán Kodály to the teaching of Arabic music, he is also the producer of several programs of traditional music and anthropology on Radio Monastir and on national television.

Since 2005, he has devoted his time to composition and research on Sufi music in Tunisia.

 Education 

The city of Monastir has:

 Five Junior High Schools of basic education: Ali-Bourguiba, Moufida-Bourguiba Imtiez, Salem-Bchir and a pioneer junior high school;
 Four High Schools: Fatouma-Bourguiba, Hedi-Khefacha, Bourguiba and a Pioneer high school (open since the school year 2003–2004).

Monastir is also a university city, incorporating the University of Monastir which was founded on September 2, 2004 and covers the governorates of Monastir and Mahdia. The university of Monastir includes sixteen faculty departments, of which ten are located in Monastir:

 Faculty of science 
 Faculty of medicine 
 Faculty of dental medicine 
 Faculty of pharmacy 
 The National Engineering School of Monastir
 The Higher School of science and technologies of health
 The Higher Institutes of Biotechnology
 The Higher Institutes Computer Science and Mathematics 
 The Higher Institutes Fashion Trades
 The Preparatory Institute for Engineering Studies

The student population of Monastir exceeded 27,000 in 2007–2008, making the city one of the largest in terms of university studies along with Tunis, Sfax and Sousse.

 Sport 
Monastir is represented by the US Monastir in football and the basketball. In 2022, the US Monastir won the BAL after being the finalist in 2021 BAL season.

The monastirian team plays its matches in the Mustapha Ben Jannet stadium for the football, and the Mohamed-Mzali indoor'' for the basketball.

Notable people
Tunisian ex-president Habib Bourguiba was born in Monastir, and his mausoleum is located in the city.
Many other famous politicians are also from Monastir: 
 Mohamed Mzali, prime minister of Tunisia from 1980 to 1986
 Hedi Amara Nouira, prime minister of Tunisia from 1970 to 1980
Among other notable people: 
Jawhar Mnari, footballer, born in Monastir and  winner of DFB-Pokal (2006/2007).
Hamza Younés, footballer

Twin towns – sister cities

Monastir is twinned with:
 Dushanbe, Tajikistan
 Manisa, Turkey
 Münster, Germany
 Saint-Étienne, France
 Tétouan, Morocco
 Tizi Ouzou, Algeria

Gallery

Neighbouring area

Hugging Tunisia's coastline, Skanes is a holiday resort known mostly for its professional golf courses; white, sandy beaches; clear blue sea; and hotels that fuse Moorish architecture with modern designs. It is frequented throughout the summer by tourists from around the world. They also come for the medina, where it is possible to sample fresh Tunisian cooking and bargain for local goods.

References

Notes

External links

 USMonastir.com, official web site of the local multi-sports team
Photo gallery of the city of Monastir by French naval intelligence in 1924.

Cities in Tunisia
Communes of Tunisia
Seaside resorts in Tunisia
Populated places in Monastir Governorate